The men's qualification for the Olympic basketball tournament will occur between August 2023 and 2024, allocating twelve teams for the final tournament. All five FIBA (International Basketball Federation) zones are expected to have a representation in the Olympic basketball event. 

As the host nation, France reserves a quota place in the men's 5×5 basketball; however, it is subject to a FIBA Central Board decision to be made on 30 June 2023. The 2023 FIBA Basketball World Cup will produce seven directly qualified national teams for Paris 2024. The last four quota places will be assigned to the winners of separate wild card tournaments.

Method
Twelve teams will participate in the men's basketball tournament, with each NOC sending a roster of 12 players.

Host nation
As the host nation, France reserves a direct quota place in the men's basketball subject to the FIBA Central Board decision to be made on 30 June 2023. If the FIBA Central Board does not award a direct spot to the host country, the number of teams qualified through the regular process shall be increased accordingly.

Qualification via World Cup
Similar to the 2019 format, the 2023 FIBA Basketball World Cup will distribute seven quota places to the best teams from respective continents based on the final classification as follows:
 FIBA Africa – 1 team
 FIBA Americas – 2 teams
 FIBA Asia – 1 team
 FIBA Europe – 2 teams
 FIBA Oceania – 1 team

Qualification via the wild card tournament
The four remaining quota places are attributed to the 12-team field through the two-round FIBA World Olympic Qualifying Tournaments. The first round, the FIBA Olympic pre-qualifying tournaments (FOPQTs), will be played at the continental level and the second, the FIBA Olympic pre-qualifying tournaments (FOQTs), at the global level.

Participation in the FIBA Olympic pre-qualifying tournaments
Forty teams that failed to qualify for the 2023 FIBA Basketball World Cup are eligible to participate in the FOPQTs. For each continent, teams will be selected by competing in the second round of 2023 FIBA Basketball World Cup qualification and by certain qualification or ranking criteria among those that did not play in the second round.

 FIBA Africa – 8 teams: 7 teams eliminated from the second round of the African qualifiers for the 2023 FIBA Basketball World Cup, along with the highest-ranked team by FIBA ranking that did not play in the second round.
 FIBA Americas – 8 teams: 5 teams eliminated from the second round of the Americas qualifiers for the 2023 FIBA Basketball World Cup, along with three of the highest-ranked teams by FIBA ranking that did not play in the second round.
 FIBA Asia and FIBA Oceania – 8 teams: 4 teams eliminated from the second round of the Asia and Oceania qualifiers for the 2023 FIBA Basketball World Cup, along with the four teams eliminated from the first round
 FIBA Europe – 16 teams: 12 teams eliminated from the second round of the European qualifiers for the 2023 FIBA Basketball World Cup, along with the four teams advanced from the second round of EuroBasket 2025 pre-qualifiers to qualifiers.

From the Africa, Americas, and Asia tournaments,  the winner will advance to the FOQTs, while two teams from European FOPQTs will clinch their spot at FOQTs.

Participation in the FIBA Olympic Qualifying Tournaments
Twenty-four teams will participate in four tournaments with winners earning the last four berths at the Olympics. Along with the five teams advanced from FOPQTs, 19 teams will be selected based on their performance at 2023 FIBA Basketball World Cup:
 FIBA Africa – the highest-ranked team from Africa at the World Cup apart from direct qualifiers
 FIBA Americas – the highest-ranked team from the Americas at the World Cup apart from direct qualifiers
 FIBA Asia and FIBA Oceania – the highest-ranked team from Asia/Oceania at the World Cup apart from direct qualifiers
 The next sixteen best-placed teams not directly qualified for the Olympics

Qualified teams

Qualification via 2023 FIBA Basketball World Cup ranking

Final standing by FIBA zone

FIBA Olympic qualifying tournaments

FIBA Pre-Qualifying Olympic Tournaments
The tournaments will be held from 12 to 20 August 2023.

FIBA Africa

FIBA Asia and Oceania

FIBA Americas

FIBA Europe

References

 
Basketball at the 2024 Summer Olympics
Qualification for the 2024 Summer Olympics
2024